Retithrips is a genus of thrips in the family Thripidae, first described in 1910 by Paul Marchal. These thrips are leaf-feeding.

Species

The IRMNG lists one species: Retithrips javanicus Karny, 1923, but GBIF also includes Retithrips syriacus (Mayet, 1890).

References

Thripidae
Taxa named by Paul Marchal
Taxa described in 1910